Inverness Union Football Club was a football club from Inverness, Scotland. They were one of the original members of the Highland Football League. Their colours were red shirts and white shorts. They merged with Inverness Thistle in 1895.

References

Defunct football clubs in Scotland
Association football clubs disestablished in 1895
Former Highland Football League teams
1883 establishments in Scotland
1895 disestablishments in Scotland
Sport in Inverness